Annandale were an Australian rugby league football club which played in the New South Wales Rugby Football League premiership from 1910 to 1920. Based in Annandale, New South Wales and nicknamed "The Dales", the club's colours were red and gold.

The club was never able to finish higher than fifth in their eleven-year history and won just one match in their final three seasons. At the insistence of South Sydney this, combined with the industrialisation of the area led to their omission from the competition for further seasons at the end of 1920. All these events are often attributed to the fact that fewer players were eligible to play under the residency rules in place at the time (Glebe would also later fall victim, in part, to this phenomenon).

History
Annandale began their first season with a very poor start, losing their first four games straight which as it turned out sent them immediately out of the race for the premiership. They did, however, recover well and finished with five wins, one draw and eight losses. The first of these wins came in round 5 against a Western Suburbs side that had won just 3 out of 23 matches in their three-year history. At the end of the season, Annandale finished sixth out of the eight teams.

The 1911 season was arguably Annandale's most successful, managing to win five of their fourteen games, equalling their performance in the previous year. However, they were able to finish one place higher on the ladder, in fifth position.

In 1912 the club were able to claim an 8–5 win against Balmain in the second round of the season but followed this up with eleven losses in a row. In equal last position with Western Suburbs heading into the final round of the season, the two clubs by coincidence were scheduled to play their final match of the season against one another. Despite having lost to Western Suburbs in round seven, Annandale won the match 15–6, avoiding them claiming the wooden spoon.

As it turned out, the scenario for Annandale in the final rounds of the 1913 season were similar to those they experienced in 1912. They were again in equal last position with Western Suburbs with two rounds to play and up against one another in a match which would most likely decide who would finish last. Replicating their win from the previous season, Annandale took out the match 18–0. Although they lost their last match of the season narrowly to second-placed Newtown 10–8 whilst Western Suburbs won their own match, Annandale are deemed to have avoided the last place due to a superior points scoring difference despite finishing on equal competition points.

The club claimed just one draw from their first eleven games of the 1914 season, leaving them in last position and three points behind Western Suburbs. The two teams travelled to Goulburn, with Annandale needing to win to avoid receiving their first wooden spoon. In this match, however, Western Suburbs won 6–4, ensuring Annandale were to finish last. Although claiming an elusive win, their only one of the season, against three-time defending premiers Eastern Suburbs in the second last round of the season, their effort was futile as they took out their first wooden spoon.

In 1915 the club got three wins, including another one against Western Suburbs in the final match of the season, to finish two points clear of last-placed North Sydney and Western Suburbs. In 1916 they began the season poorly, winning just one of their first ten games and leaving them two points behind Western Suburbs in last position. They were then able to win three games in a row and ended up finishing seventh. The 1917 season was more of the same for the club, losing their first nine matches before claiming two draws in the next three weeks. In a match against equal last North Sydney in the second last round of the season, Annandale prevailed in a close match 3–2 meaning they were again able to narrowly avoid the wooden spoon.

Annandale were unable to win a game in 1918, scoring ten points or more just twice whilst conceding ten points or less on just two occasions. They won just one match in 1919, an important second-last round match against North Sydney which was to again decide who would finish in last position. This victory allowed them to finish seventh despite having won just the one match. In 1920 they once again failed to win a match and lost by less than 9 points on only one occasion.

Seasons 
NOTE: P=Premiers, R=Runners-Ups, M=Minor Premierships, F=Finals Appearance, W=Wooden Spoons (Brackets Represent Finals Games)

Statistics and records
Out of the 33 clubs that have contested in the premiership over the years, Annandale's performance is ranked as the second worst of all. Out of 153 games played, the club won 25, drew six and lost 122 for a winning percentage of 18.3%. As of 2016, only on seven occasions has a team failed to win a game in a season. Annandale achieved this twice, in 1918 and 1920.

Club records

Biggest Win
 22 points, 25–3 against Western Suburbs Magpies at Wentworth Park on 29 July 1911.

Biggest Loss
 49 points, 52–3 against Western Suburbs Magpies at Pratten Park on 31 July 1920.

Most Consecutive Wins
 3 matches, 1 – 15 July 1916.

Most Consecutive Losses
 16 matches, 18 July 1917 – 10 May 1919.

Wooden Spoons
1914,1918,1920

See also

List of rugby league clubs in Australia

Footnotes

External links
Rugby League History – RL1908.com – Annandale RLFC
Rugby League Tables / Annandale
Annandale's seasons at rleague.com

Sports clubs disestablished in 1920
Rugby league teams in New South Wales
Defunct rugby league teams in Australia
Defunct NSWRL/ARL/SL/NRL clubs
Rugby league teams in Sydney
Rugby clubs established in 1910
1910 establishments in Australia
Annandale, New South Wales